LIVELOVEDIE is the fourth album by rock band Perpetual Groove.

Track listing
"Save For One"
"Two Shores"
"To Shed Light or Cast Shadows"
"Mayday"
"It Starts Where it Ends"
"Crapshoot"
"Dust"
"So Much As Goodbye"
"Legends Of Preston"
"Speed Queen"
"Only Always"

2007 albums
Perpetual Groove albums